Noah Timothy Beck (born May 4, 2001) is an American social media personality most known for his content on TikTok. In 2019, Beck was a midfielder for the Portland Pilots men's soccer team.

Early life 
Beck was born on May 4, 2001, and is from Peoria, Arizona. He attended Ironwood High School. Beck played for the SC del Sol club soccer team in Phoenix. In Arizona, he was a team captain in the U.S. Youth Soccer Olympic Development Program from 2014 to 2017. He moved to Utah during his last two years of high school where he played for the Real Salt Lake Academy. Starting in 2019, Beck attended University of Portland where Beck was a midfielder on the Portland Pilots men's soccer. Due to the COVID-19 pandemic in Portland, Oregon, Beck completed his second semester of freshman year online before dropping out.

Career 
During the COVID-19 pandemic in 2020, Beck began using TikTok while in quarantine. His videos began to go viral within a month. , Beck had 34.1 million followers on TikTok, 9 million on Instagram, and over 1.5 million YouTube subscribers. Beck's content includes dances and skits to audio clips of songs, movies, and TV shows. In June 2020, he joined The Sway House after he was contacted by member, Blake Gray. There, Beck duets and collaborates with other social media personalities. In November 2020, Beck was criticized by fans for charging fees for duets, although he later clarified that the fees were for brand deals. TikTok listed Beck as one of the top 10 breakout content creators of 2020.

In 2021, Beck was enrolled in acting classes. He is the subject of an AwesomenessTV short-form series titled Noah Beck Tries Things. The six-episode series premiered on January 22, 2021. The show includes his girlfriend and several of his friends. In March 2021, Beck was on a digital cover of VMan. His wardrobe, including fishnet tights, cuffed jeans, and stiletto heels led to comparisons with David Bowie, Prince, Troye Sivan, and Harry Styles. In 2021, Beck was a VIP guest for the Louis Vuitton menswear show. Beck also starred in Machine Gun Kelly's 2021 music video for his song Love Race. 

On September 7, 2022, Beck faced backlash for his comments regarding the demonetized content creator Andrew Tate. Noah Beck said Andrew Tate — who is known for being misogynistic — had some "valid points." The clip has since been deleted.

On September 24, 2022, Beck participated in the Sidemen Charity match at The Valley that raised over £1,000,000 split across Campaign Against Living Miserably, Teenage Cancer Trust, Rays of Sunshine, and M7 Education. Beck finished with two assists in 83 minutes of play.

Personal life 
Beck was in a relationship with Dixie D'Amelio that started in September 2020. In December 2020, Beck and D'Amelio were criticized by fans for vacationing in Nassau, Bahamas during the COVID-19 pandemic. He responded that he needed a chance to "disconnect". Beck elaborated that they were careful, travelled by private jet, and stayed in a mostly empty hotel. D'Amelio and Beck broke up in late 2022. 

Beck is a fan of Manchester United, and his soccer idol is Cristiano Ronaldo.

Awards and nominations

See also 
 List of most-followed TikTok accounts

References

External links 
 

Living people
2001 births
People from Peoria, Arizona
Soccer players from Arizona
Association football midfielders
Real Salt Lake players
Portland Pilots men's soccer players
American TikTokers
American YouTubers
American soccer players
University of Portland alumni